The 1906–07 St Helens R.F.C. season was the club's twelfth in the Northern Rugby Football Union, the 33rd in their history. The club finished 22nd out of 27 in the Championship, whilst, in the South West Lancashire League, St Helens finished bottom. In the Challenge Cup, the club were knocked out in the first round by Swinton.

NRFU Championship

References

St Helens R.F.C. seasons
1906 in English rugby league
1907 in English rugby league